This is a List of Indian superhero films.

List of Indian superhero films

References 

Lists of film lists